Chakri ( Urdu:چَکَّرِی ) is a village in Union Council  Daulatpur near Pindi Saidpur in Pind Dadan Khan Tehsil, Jhelum District, Pakistan.

History 
Chakri is the name of Village. It history starts in 1732A.D. Name of "Chakri" is derived from urdu/sanskrit/Punjabi word 'Chakar'. It means round or circular. It is heard that, in the early days of start of Village, the shape of the village was circular. So the persons from the other Villages gave this name to our Village.

Education 
The village has a Government Girls High School Chakri, Nathial for Girls.

Health 
The village has a Government Dispensary (Rural Dispensary)  for the public.

Geography 
The name of the village located east of Chakri is Pir Chak (پیرچک).  And to the west is the village of Mirza Abad (مرزا آباد). While in the south is Pindi Saidpur (پنڈی سید پور) village.  And to the north is a very long Mountain range that resembles the Khewra salt mine.

References

 Location of Chakri -Falling Rain Genomics

Populated places in Jhelum District